Anthony Frank Boric (born 27 December 1983 in Auckland) is a former rugby union footballer who represented the New Zealand in international rugby, and was a member of the 2011 Rugby World Cup winning All Blacks squad. He played as a lock.

Early and personal life
Boric is a second-generation New Zealander of Croatian descent. His grandfather, from whom Boric acquired his middle name, hailed from the Dalmatia region. He attended school at Rosmini College in Takapuna where he played first XV rugby.

Boric then studied Civil Engineering at the University of Auckland, and in 2008, the final year of his degree, received news of his inclusion in the All Black squad when he heard his name read out on the radio.

Rugby career
Boric started playing rugby on the wing, but as he grew rapidly in his teenage years he switched into the second row, and also played as a loose forward. In his early days at North Harbour and the Blues, Boric alternated between the role of lock and blindside flank before deciding to concentrate on the former position.

After making his first appearance as an All Black coming on as a substitute against England on 13 June 2008, Boric's first match as part of the starting line-up was against the Springboks in Dunedin, replacing the suspended Brad Thorn.

Boric scored his first Test try versus Scotland on 8 November 2008

AB played his last Test match for All Black side during the winning 2011 Rugby World Cup campaign. He played 4 matches during the tournament, all of which were from the reserve bench.

References

External links
 All Blacks Profile
 Blues Profile
 North Harbour Profile
 
 Super Rugby Profile

1983 births
Living people
Blues (Super Rugby) players
New Zealand rugby union players
North Harbour rugby union players
Rugby union locks
New Zealand international rugby union players
New Zealand people of Croatian descent
People educated at Rosmini College
Rugby union players from Auckland
New Zealand expatriate rugby union players
New Zealand expatriate sportspeople in Japan
Expatriate rugby union players in Japan
Mitsubishi Sagamihara DynaBoars players
University of Auckland alumni